Borowik  (German: Forsthaus Pribbernow) is a village in the administrative district of Gmina Przybiernów, within Goleniów County, West Pomeranian Voivodeship, in north-western Poland.

References

Borowik